Mads Hinrichsen Aaquist (born 31 December 1994) is a Danish professional footballer who plays for Danish 1st Division club Fremad Amager.

Club career

Copenhagen
Aaquist is a product of F.C. Copenhagen's youth sector. He began playing for the first team in the winter 2012/13 and played several friendly matches for the club. He expressed at this point to the medias, that he would wish he was a permanent part of the first team. Aaquist gained his first Danish Superliga match and official debut for FCK on 20 May 2013, when he replaced Christian Bolaños in the final match of the season, a home game against SønderjyskE.

Just hours after the announcement of his return to FCK, it was further announced, that FCK had terminated his contract.

Loan to AC Horsens
In the autumn 2014, he was loaned out to AC Horsens for the rest of the season. Aaquist played his first match for the club on 27 July 2014 against Viborg FF. However, Aaquist was struggling to get playtime and did only play 6 matches. AC Horsens announced on 21 January 2015, that they had sent Aaquist return to FCK six months earlier than expected.

FC Helsingør
On 21 January 2015, Aaquist signed with FC Helsingør on a free transfer. He signed a contract until the summer 2015, and later extended his contract after playing 14 league games for the club in his first 6 months. He got his debut for FC Helsingør on 26 July 2015. Aaquist started on the bench, but replaced Jonas Hebo Rasmussen in the 60th minute in a 0-3 defeat against FC Roskilde in the Danish 1st Division.

The defender extended his contract for three years in May 2016. He played 27 league matches in his first season at the club.

Nordsjælland
Aaquist signed for FC Nordsjælland on 22 August 2017.

Randers
Aaquist joined Randers FC on 23 August 2018 on loan until 30 June 2019.

Viborg
After his loan spell with Randers FC, Aaquist returned to FC Nordsjælland and started in the first five league games. However, he moved to Viborg FF in the Danish 1st Division on 22 August 2019, where he signed a three-year deal.

Fremad Amager
On 31 January 2022, Aaquist joined fellow league club Fremad Amager on a deal for the rest of the season.

Position
Aaquist used to play as a fullback, mostly on the right side, but in the 2016/17 season, he mostly played as a left or right midfielder. He even played in the central midfield the whole match against Vejle Boldklub in May 2017.

Honours 
Copenhagen
Danish Superliga: 2012–13

Viborg
Danish 1st Division: 2020–21

References

External links 
  National team profile
  Mads Aaquist on Soccerway

1994 births
Danish men's footballers
Danish Superliga players
F.C. Copenhagen players
AC Horsens players
Randers FC players
FC Nordsjælland players
Viborg FF players
Fremad Amager players
Living people
Association football defenders
People from Herlev Municipality
Danish 1st Division players
FC Helsingør players
Denmark youth international footballers
Sportspeople from the Capital Region of Denmark